David Major (March 26, 1866 – July 3, 1936) was an American psychologist and author from Antioch, Clinton County, Indiana.

Early life
Major was born on March 26, 1866, in Antioch, Clinton County, Indiana to Thomas and Almeda Major. He received his bachelor of science at Wabash College in 1890. In 1896 he received his doctorate in philosophy from Cornell University.

Career
In 1897 he published his first book “The principle of teleology in the critical philosophy of Kant”. He received his diploma of education from Columbia University in 1899 and taught for one year at the University of Nebraska before transferring to Columbia University and teaching for one year. In 1901 he became a professor in psychology at Ohio State University and had his first son.

In 1903 he had his second son, and in 1906 he wrote his second book “First steps in mental growth”. In 1913 he wrote his third and final book “Elements of psychology”. He retired his teaching career in 1914, and in 1916 he received his bachelor in law from Indiana University Robert H. McKinney School of Law.

He died in 1936 at the age of 70, and is buried at the Greenlawn cemetery in Frankfort, Indiana.

References

20th-century American psychologists
People from Clinton County, Indiana
1866 births
1936 deaths

Wabash College alumni
Cornell University alumni
Columbia University alumni
Indiana University Robert H. McKinney School of Law alumni
University of Nebraska–Lincoln faculty
Columbia University faculty
Ohio State University faculty
Writers from Indiana
American psychology writers